The Javan tesia (Tesia superciliaris) is a species of Old World warbler in the family Cettiidae. It is endemic to Java in Indonesia. The Javan tesia is a small tesia with long legs and almost no tail. It feeds on insects in the undergrowth of broadleaf forest.

References

Javan tesia
Birds of Java
Javan tesia
Javan tesia
Taxonomy articles created by Polbot